Variimorda is a genus of beetles in the family Mordellidae, containing the following species:

Species
Subgenus Galeimorda
 Variimorda caprai (Franciscolo, 1951)
 Variimorda fagniezi (Méquignon, 1946)
 Variimorda fagusai (Méquignon, 1946)
 Variimorda hladili Horák, 1985
 Variimorda krikkeni Batten, 1977
 Variimorda theryi (Méquignon, 1946)
Subgenus Variimorda
 Variimorda argyropleura (Franciscolo, 1942)
 Variimorda basalis (Costa, 1854)
 Variimorda briantea (Comolli, 1837)
 Variimorda flavimana (Marseul, 1876)
 Variimorda holzschuhi Horák, 1985
 Variimorda ihai Chûjô, 1959
 Variimorda inomatai Takakuwa, 1985
 Variimorda ishiharai Kiyoyama, 1994
 Variimorda kurosawai Takakuwa, 2001
 Variimorda mendax Méquignon, 1946
 Variimorda persica Horák, 1985
 Variimorda quomoi (Franciscolo, 1942)
 Variimorda ragusai (Emery, 1876)
 Variimorda shiyakei Horak, 1996
 Variimorda truncatopyga (Pic, 1938)
 Variimorda villosa (Schrank, 1781)

References

Mordellidae